Bolhrad Raion is a raion (district) in Odesa Oblast of Ukraine. It is part of the historical region of Bessarabia. Its administrative center is the town of Bolhrad. Population: 

On 18 July 2020, as part of the administrative reform of Ukraine, the number of raions of Odesa Oblast was reduced to seven, and the area of Bolhrad Raion was significantly expanded.  The January 2020 estimate of the raion population was

Administrative division

Current
After the reform in July 2020, the raion consisted of 10 hromadas:
 Artsyz Hromada
 Bolhrad urban hromada with the administration in the city of Bolhrad, retained from Bolhrad Raion;
 Borodine Hromada
 Horodnie rural hromada with the administration in the selo of Horodnie, retained from Bolhrad Raion;
 Krynychne rural hromada with the administration in the selo of Krynychne, retained from Bolhrad Raion;
 Kubei rural hromada  with the administration in the selo of Kubei, retained from Bolhrad Raion;
 Pavlivka Hromada
 Tarutyne Hromada
 Teplystia Hromada
 Vasylivka rural hromada with the administration in the selo of Vasylivka, retained from Bolhrad Raion;

Before 2020

Before the 2020 reform, the raion consisted of five hromadas, 
 Bolhrad urban hromada with the administration in Bolhrad;
 Horodnie rural hromada with the administration in Horodnie;
 Krynychne rural hromada with the administration in Krynychne;
 Kubei rural hromada with the administration in Kubei;
 Vasylivka rural hromada with the administration in Vasylivka.

References

 
Raions of Odesa Oblast
Bulgarian communities in Ukraine
1940 establishments in Ukraine